The Bow Leg is a highly resilient robotic leg being developed for running robots at Carnegie Mellon University's Robotics Institute. The key technology is the fiber-reinforced composite (FRC) spring that bends like a bow to store elastic energy.

History of the Bow Leg 
Legged robots were initially conceptualized to provide more effective transportation across rough terrains unreachable by conventional wheeled or tracked vehicles. Legged locomotion studies began in 1878, when a publication of stop-motion photographs of mammals was posted in Scientific American.  The first robot capable of actual "running" was created in 1980. The field was greatly enhanced when the Leg Lab at Carnegie Mellon University was established, producing many running robots. This was followed soon by MIT creating their own lab as well.

The major difficulties lying in these robots lied in the balance, the actuation, power requirements, and environment sensing. While the balance has been worked on extensively by many researchers, the second and third are often bypassed by providing a form of umbilical cable to supply energy and allow for larger actuators to be used. The environment sensing remains to be a large issue that has not been solved effectively enough to try and outdo typical animal behavior in rough terrains.

Recently, more advanced hopping robots have been developed by researchers at the Department of Energy's Sandia National Laboratories, who have used piston systems to make jumps as high as 20 feet in the air. However, these robots do not compare much to the bow leg at the moment as they do not run, but rather just jump as high as possible.

Makeup of the Bow Leg 
The bow leg is made of a curved leaf spring (providing the "bow" portion of the assembly), a foot on the end of the spring, a pivoting hip, and a string that causes the string to go through phases of compression.

The name of the leg comes from the device's resemblance to an archer's bow in medieval culture.

The spring is retracted into the device while it is in the air in order to bend the leg and begin storing potential energy. Upon collision with the ground, the string releases, allowing the bow to extend to full length and turn the stored energy into motion for the machine. At the hip of the device, the leg pivots freely in order to minimize body disturbance torque.

The goal of the bow leg is to provide a device that can provide the functionality of an entire leg structure using only a single spring. This allows for the most efficient use of energy and the least loss of energy. The typical losses in a legged system are negative work and leg sweep. Negative work happens when an actuator applies force opposite from its motion and absorbs energy from the system accidentally. This can be eliminated by a design that avoids articulation altogether. Leg sweep losses come from the need to accelerate the foot to match the speed of the ground moving past it, and it is kept minimal by using a very light leg that does not hold much inertia that needs to be fought against.

Terrain Complications
The process involved in planning the device's ability to move around is very limited by the available information regarding terrain. In many of the "bow leg" experiments that are conducted (including the ones referenced here), the planner is assuming that they already know both the geometry and friction coefficient of the terrain. In actual practice, either of these vital factors can be incorrectly measured or guessed at, causing many issues in the device's ability to traverse the terrain. However, only small parts of the terrain ever come into contact with the foot, therefore the necessary calculations are minimized, and false positives can be accepted in certain scenarios. The issues are effectively doubled when it is necessary to take into consideration the possibility of an obstacle above the device, as well as the ones that it must traverse below.

References

Robot legs